Edward William Whelpley (1818 – February 21, 1864) was a New Jersey attorney and politician who served as Speaker of the New Jersey General Assembly in 1849 and as Chief Justice of the New Jersey Supreme Court from 1861 until his death in 1864.

Early life, education, and career
Born in Morristown, New Jersey, Whelpley was the son of Dr. William A. Whelpley, a New England-born physician and cousin of the Reverend Samuel Whelpley.

He graduated from Princeton University, with distinction, in 1834, at the age of sixteen. After teaching school for two years, he studied law with his uncle, Vice-Chancellor Amzi Dodd. Whelpley was licensed as attorney at the May term, 1839, and as counsellor three years later. He entered the practice of law in Newark, New Jersey, and in 1841 he moved back to Morristown and became a partner of the Jacob W. Miller.

Whelpley had a legal rivalry with attorney Abraham O. Zabriskie, who was formidable when dedicating his full efforts to a case. Amzi Dodd related an account of a case in which Whelpley retained Dodd as his junior in a doubtful contest against Zabriskie and told Dodd to open the argument and to state the case as mildly as he could, so that "old Zab" should not be aroused. Dodd accepted the role and played it, and Zabriskie "was not waked up to make much of an effort", and then Whelpley, having the last word, "put the case with all his power".

In 1847 he was elected to the New Jersey General Assembly representing Morris Township, New Jersey, and served in the sessions of 1848 and 1849, being made Speaker of the Assembly in 1849.

Judicial career
In the fall of 1858, Whelpley, then forty years old, was appointed to seat on the New Jersey Supreme Court vacated by the resignation of Justice Martin Ryerson. Less than three years later, on January 31, 1861 Whelpley was elevated to the position of Chief Justice, succeeding Henry W. Green, who had become Chancellor of New Jersey. Whelpley's promotion "was generally approved and it was hoped that he would remain for many years at the head of the court". However, Whelpley died in 1864, after only three years in office.

Noted opinions

In the 1860 case of Adams v. Ross, argued by Zabriskie and Bradley, Whelpley held that the use of the word "heirs" is necessary to the creation of a fee, and that no other expression of intent will supply the omission and, consequently, that a grant to one for life and then to her children was not a fee simple or fee tail but an estate for life, with a covenant to stand seized for the benefit of the children, in which the husband was not entitled to curtesy, and that the grant was not enlarged by a warranty to the grantee and her heirs.

The 1862 case of Newark City Bank v. The Assessor, related to the taxation of United States bonds and state bonds expressly exempted from taxation, and arose out of the New Jersey tax act of March 28, 1862, passed for the purpose of more equal distribution of the burden of taxation rendered necessary by the American Civil War. Whelpley controverted the reasoning of a recent decision of the Court of Appeals of New York, holding that United States bonds were taxable if included in the bulk of the property of the person taxed. Whelpley further decided that both state and federal laws made national credit in the hands of an individual is free from taxation by the state. He discussed also the power of taxation of extra-territorial stocks when owned by persons taxable in the state, holding that corporations were entitled to have amounts of exempt state and national securities deducted from their capital and surplus.

In Telfer v. Northern Railroad Company, Whelpley articulated the rule that in the absence of legislation or lawful municipal restriction it is not negligence for railroad trains to run at high speed over crossings of common highways, even when other vehicles are approaching upon the highway, and that the care to be used "must be in proportion to the danger incident to the particular locality". He discussed the measure of damages for the death of a child under the statute giving an action for death and allowing damages for the pecuniary injury and held the damages found to be excessive.

Personal life and death
Whelpley married Eliza Woodruff of Mendham, with whom he had a son and three daughters. There is a portrait of the Chief Justice in the Supreme Court room.  He was a strong man in apparently vigorous health, but after a little more than two years as Chief Justice he was stricken with Bright's disease and died in Morristown, New Jersey, in 1864, at the age of 46.

References

1818 births
1864 deaths
People from Morristown, New Jersey
Princeton University alumni
U.S. state supreme court judges admitted to the practice of law by reading law
Speakers of the New Jersey General Assembly
Justices of the Supreme Court of New Jersey
Chief Justices of the Supreme Court of New Jersey
Deaths from nephritis